The Memphis Maniax were an American football team based in Memphis, Tennessee. The team was part of the XFL begun by Vince McMahon of World Wrestling Entertainment and by NBC, a major television network in the United States. Home games were played at Liberty Bowl Memorial Stadium.

History
The team's name and logo were designed to lead the team's fans into calling the team "The Ax", a shortened form of the word "maniacs".

The Maniax Director of Player Personnel was Steve Ortmayer, who had become respected in the pro football world for helping to build the Super Bowl XVIII-champion Los Angeles Raiders. Steve Ehrhart, who had managed both the Memphis Showboats and Memphis Mad Dogs, returned as general manager for the Maniax.  The head coach was Kippy Brown.

At slightly over 20,000 fans per game, the Maniax were in the lower half of league average attendance; this figure was higher than the Mad Dogs had drawn, and comparable to that of the NFL's Tennessee Oilers during their lone season in Memphis, but lower than the Showboats.

They were in the Western Division with the Los Angeles Xtreme, San Francisco Demons, and Las Vegas Outlaws. They finished tied for second place at 5-5 with the Demons, but did not make the playoffs as the Demons had the better division record during the season.  The Maniax were one of two teams to beat the eventual league champion Xtreme, and the only team to beat them twice, going 2-0 vs. their divisional rivals in the regular season; not coincidentally, they, along with the Xtreme and Demons, were the only three XFL teams to maintain the same starting quarterback through the entire season.

NBC officials wanted to move the XFL games to afternoons after the first season (2001) due to dismal ratings, and when, somewhat to McMahon's surprise and disappointment the United Paramount Network (UPN) wanted to follow suit, the league was then folded and the team disbanded.

Ehrhart would later claim that he was originally approached by the XFL to sell the intellectual property rights of the United States Football League to them, but that he owned the rights to the league, received royalties from them, and refused to sell. (Ehrhart's claims are somewhat dubious as he never held any ownership stake in the league, the original XFL had an Attitude Era aesthetic which did not match the brands the USFL had, and the United States Patent and Trademark Office has never recognized any claims from any vestige of the USFL, which dissolved in 1990, regarding the league's intellectual properties and has allowed other organizations to register the trademarks.)

Season by season

|-
|2001 || 5 || 5 || 0 || 3rd Western || --
|}

Schedule

Regular season

Standings

Team leaders

Rushing yards: 528 – Rashaan Salaam

(1994 Heisman Trophy winner)

Receiving yards: 823 – Charles Jordan

Passing yards: 1,499 – Jim Druckenmiller
all-XFL has the complete team stats

References

 
XFL (2001) teams
2001 establishments in Tennessee
2001 disestablishments in Tennessee
American football teams in Tennessee
American football teams established in 2001
American football teams disestablished in 2001